Vinícius Pacheco dos Santos (born 27 September 1985), known as Vinícius Pacheco, is a Brazilian footballer who plays as an attacking midfielder for Portuguesa.

Club career
Born in São Gonçalo, Rio de Janeiro, Vinícius Pacheco started his career in Flamengo. In 2008, he joined Ipatinga on loan, but only played one match in Campeonato Mineiro before he left the club in February.

During the 2008–09 season he played on loan with Belenenses in the Portuguese Primeira Liga.

On 22 June 2011 he signed with Serbian club Red Star Belgrade. Later that day he was officially presented by the club's athletic supervisor at the club press conference. On 2 July 2011, Red Star played a friendly match against SC Columbia Floridsdorf from Austria. Pacheco broke his leg in the 40th minute of the match and was carried out of the pitch. He will make his league debut for Red Star 9 months later, on 24 March 2012, as a substitute in a 20th round match against Borac Čačak.

Career

Career statistics
(Correct )

according to combined sources on the Flamengo official website and Flaestatística.Player profile at Flaestatística (in Portuguese)

1 Including 2 matches in 2004 Rio de Janeiro State League.
2 Including 2 matches in 2006 Rio de Janeiro State League.
3 Including 1 match in 2008 Minas Gerais State League.
4 Including 1 match in 2008 Rio de Janeiro State League.
5 Including 15 matches and 4 goals in 2010 Rio de Janeiro State League.
6 Including 8 matches and 1 goal in 2011 Rio Grande do Sul State League.

Honours
Flamengo
Rio de Janeiro State League (1): 2008
Copa do Brasil (1): 2006

References

External links
 
 placar 
 Guardian Stats Centre 
 Vinícius Pacheco dos Santos Stats at Utakmica.rs 
 

1985 births
Living people
People from São Gonçalo, Rio de Janeiro
Brazilian footballers
Expatriate footballers in Serbia
Expatriate footballers in Portugal
Campeonato Brasileiro Série A players
Campeonato Brasileiro Série B players
Campeonato Brasileiro Série C players
Primeira Liga players
Serbian SuperLiga players
CR Flamengo footballers
Paraná Clube players
Ipatinga Futebol Clube players
C.F. Os Belenenses players
Figueirense FC players
Grêmio Foot-Ball Porto Alegrense players
Red Star Belgrade footballers
Clube Náutico Capibaribe players
América Futebol Clube (RN) players
Boavista Sport Club players
Volta Redonda FC players
Avaí FC players
Fortaleza Esporte Clube players
Associação Atlética Portuguesa (RJ) players
Association football midfielders
Sportspeople from Rio de Janeiro (state)